Greater Than Fame is a 1920 American silent drama film produced and distributed by Selznick Pictures. It was directed by Alan Crosland and stars Elaine Hammerstein. It is not known whether the film currently survives.

Plot
As described in a film magazine, Margaret Brooke (Hammerstein), a young small town woman, is given an allowance of twenty dollars a week to go to the city to have her voice trained. She falls in with an elderly musician, who cares for her, and a young composer, with whom she falls in love. The Warings, wealthy and sophisticated, take an interest in Margaret, Mrs. Waring (Gordon) inviting her into their home so that she may see a gathering of successful artists and learn their shortcomings, while Philip Waring (Tooker), unprincipled, seeking to bring about her downfall. Margaret accepts, innocently, the apartment Mr. Waring secures for her. Her sweetheart sees Mr. Waring come to her apartment and misunderstands. She then goes to the home of the master of the Cosmopolitan Opera House, and he also makes undesirable advances. Returning to the home of the man she loves, she vindicates herself and the two begin their fight for fame together.

Cast

Production
Director Alan Crosland hired internationally recognized dancer Mlle. Desiree Lubovska to appear in an upscale party sequence. Lubovska appears as a specialty dancer.

The working title of the film was Love or Fame?

References

External links

 
Synopsis at tcm.com

1920 films
American silent feature films
1920 drama films
Silent American drama films
Films directed by Alan Crosland
Films about opera
Films set in New York City
American black-and-white films
Selznick Pictures films
1920s American films
1920s English-language films